Lophanthus is a genus of plants in the family Lamiaceae, first described in 1763. It is native to central and southwestern Asia from Turkey to Mongolia, with many of the species endemic to Iran.

Species
 Lophanthus adenocladus (Bornm.) Levin - Iran
 Lophanthus allotrius (Rech.f.) A.L.Budantzev - Iran
 Lophanthus archibaldii (Rech.f.) A.L.Budantzev - Iran
 Lophanthus chinensis Benth. - Mongolia, Xinjiang, Siberia (Buryatiya, Chita, Tuva, Irkutsk) 
 Lophanthus depauperatus (Benth.) Levin - Iran
 Lophanthus dschuparensis (Bornm.) Levin - Iran
 Lophanthus elegans (Lipsky) Levin - Afghanistan, Tajikistan
 Lophanthus hedgei (Freitag) A.L.Budantzev - Afghanistan
 Lophanthus iranshahrii (Rech.f.) A.L.Budantzev - Iran
 Lophanthus krylovii Lipsky - Mongolia, Xinjiang, Kazakhstan, Altai
 Lophanthus laxiflorus (Benth.) Levin - Iran
 Lophanthus michauxii (Briq.) Levin - Iran
 Lophanthus ouroumitanensis (Franch.) Kochk. & Zuckerw. - Afghanistan, Tajikistan
 Lophanthus oxyodontus (Boiss.) Levin - Iran
 Lophanthus pinetorum (Aitch. & Hemsl.) Levin - Afghanistan, Pakistan, western Himalayas
 Lophanthus schrenkii Levin - Xinjiang, Kazakhstan, Kyrgyzstan
 Lophanthus schtschurowskianus (Regel) Lipsky - Kyrgyzstan, Tajikistan
 Lophanthus sessilifolius (Bunge) Levin - Iran, Pakistan
 Lophanthus subnivalis Lipsky - Kyrgyzstan, Tajikistan
 Lophanthus tibeticus C.Y.Wu & Y.C.Huang - Tibet
 Lophanthus tschimganicus Lipsky - Kyrgyzstan, Uzbekistan
 Lophanthus turcicus Dirmenci, Yıldız & Hedge - Turkey
 Lophanthus varzobicus Kochk. - Tajikistan

References

Lamiaceae
Lamiaceae genera